Mathoris loceusalis is a moth of the family Thyrididae first described by Francis Walker in 1859. It is found in India, Sri Lanka and Australia.

Its wings are brownish with a reddish outline. Two to three red-outlined white spots are found near the cell of the forewings. There is a black spot near the middle of the hindwings.

Larval food plants are Dendrophthoe glabrescens and Loranthus species.

References

External links
Cretaceous origin and repeated tertiary diversification of the redefined butterflies
Cool habitats support darker and bigger butterflies in Australian tropical forests

Moths of Asia
Moths described in 1859
Thyrididae